Daniel Kwesi Ashiamah is a Ghanaian politician and member of the Seventh Parliament of the Fourth Republic of Ghana representing the Buem Constituency in the Volta Region on the ticket of the National Democratic Congress.

References

Ghanaian MPs 2017–2021
1968 births
Living people
National Democratic Congress (Ghana) politicians